Simulation Open Framework Architecture (SOFA) is an open source framework primarily targeted at real-time physical simulation, with an emphasis on medical simulation. 
It is mostly intended for the research community to help develop newer algorithms, but can also be used as an efficient prototyping tool or as a physics engine.

Features
Based on an advanced software architecture, SOFA allows users to:
 Create complex and evolving simulations by combining new algorithms with existing algorithms
 Modify most parameters of the simulation (deformable behavior, surface representation, solver, constraints, collision algorithm, ...) by simply editing a XML file
 Build complex models from simpler ones using a scene graph description
 Efficiently simulate the dynamics of interacting objects using abstract equation solvers
 Reuse and easily compare a variety of available methods
 Transparently parallelize complex computations using semantics based on data dependencies
 Use new generations of GPUs through the CUDA API to greatly improve computation times

Scene graph
A key aspect of SOFA is the use of a scene graph to organize and process the elements of a simulation while clearly separating the computation tasks from their possibly parallel scheduling. The description of a SOFA simulation can easily be done in an XML file. For even more flexibility, a Python plugin allows scripting simulations using the Python language. 
Basically, a SOFA scene-graph is composed with:
 Nodes: used to categorise the components and keep the XML file clean (mechanical node, collision node, visual node, ...)
 Components: main elements used to build a scene (solver component, forcefield component, rendering component, ...)
 Data: everything that components have to deal with (forces, velocities, positions, ratios, ...)

Plugins
To extend its capacities and provide more features, SOFA is bundled with a lot of plugins:
 Drivers for VR / haptic / simulation devices (Geomagic®, ARTTrack™, Novint® Falcon™…)
 Visualization and simulation of medical images
 Python scripting
 Parallelization:
 Multithreading
 GPU computing using the CUDA API

Community

SOFA Day
Organized each year, the SOFA Day is a one-day event dedicated to SOFA. This event is open to everyone interested in SOFA, from beginner to advanced users. It contains an introduction to SOFA, several tutorials (adapted to the audience) and a large time to experience SOFA with the help of the instructors.

SOFA Consortium
Exactly ten years after the first commit in SOFA, Inria founded the SOFA Consortium in December 2015. 
The Consortium missions are to:
 Represent the identity of SOFA
 Organize and develop the community
 Distribute and make SOFA more stable

See also

 Graphics processing unit (GPU)
 Soft body dynamics
 Rigid body dynamics
 Collision detection
 VRPN

References

External links
 SOFA website

Computer physics engines
Computational science
Simulation software
Medical simulation
Health software